GCIRS 16SW, also known as S97, is a contact binary star located in the Galactic Center. It is composed of two hot massive stars of equal size that orbit each other with a period of 19.5 days. The stars are so close that their atmospheres overlap, and the two stars form an eclipsing binary varying in brightness by 0.35 magnitudes at infrared wavelengths.

GCIRS 16SW orbits Sagittarius A* at approximately 19,000 AU, with a period of approximately 1,270 years. At the stars' estimated mass of about 50 solar masses, they are predicted to have a lifespan of about 4 million years, indicating that the system formed within  of Sagittarius A*, instead of having migrated inward from a greater distance.

GCIRS 16SW was classified as a candidate luminous blue variable on the basis of its spectrum and physical properties.  This was before it was identified as an eclipsing binary, but it is still treated as a candidate LBV.

Each star is strongly distorted by the gravity of the other star. The secondary component is found to have a temperature 96% of that of the primary. However, these temperatures yield a luminosity over a million times that of the sun, uncomfortably close to the Eddington luminosity for each star, and it is suspected the actual temperatures are slightly lower.

References

Sagittarius (constellation)
Wolf–Rayet stars
Eclipsing binaries